Lee Chin-yung (born 1 August 1951) is a Taiwanese politician. He was a member of the Legislative Yuan from 1993 to 1997, when he was elected Mayor of Keelung. Lee remained mayor until 2001. He served as acting Yunlin County magistrate in 2005, and later served a full term in the office between 2014 and 2018. Following an unsuccessful bid for reelection as Yunlin County magistrate, Lee was appointed chairperson of the Central Election Commission in 2019.

Education
Lee received his bachelor's and master's degrees in law from National Chung Hsing University and National Taiwan University, respectively.

Early political career
Lee was a judge on the Hualien, Yilan and Taichung district courts, prior to sitting on the Legislative Yuan from 1993 to 1997 as a representative of Keelung, followed by a single term as mayor of Keelung. Lee's victory in the 1997 Keelung mayoral election was later credited to a split in the Pan-Blue Coalition.

2001 Keelung City mayoralty election
Lee ran for reelection as Mayor of Keelung in 2001 under the Democratic Progressive Party banner. However, he lost to Kuomintang candidate Hsu Tsai-li.

Subsequently, Lee served in successive vice ministerial posts within the Ministry of the Interior and Public Construction Commission. This was followed by an appointment as acting Yunlin County Magistrate in 2005. Later, he returned to the Executive Yuan as vice minister within the Ministry of Justice, and Ministry of Transportation and Communications.

Magistrate of Yunlin County

2014 Yunlin County magistrate election
Lin represented the Democratic Progressive Party and won the 2014 Yunlin County magistrate election held on 29 November 2014.

2018 Yunlin County magistrate election

Later political career
Lee was nominated to the chairmanship of the Central Election Commission (CEC) in February 2019. Following his nomination, he left the Democratic Progressive Party in an effort to remain neutral while leading the CEC. The Legislative Yuan voted on 28 May 2019 to approve Lee's nomination to the Central Election Commission. Lee's nomination for a second term was approved in October 2021.

References

External links

 

1951 births
Living people
Magistrates of Yunlin County
National Taiwan University alumni
Democratic Progressive Party Members of the Legislative Yuan
Mayors of Keelung
Members of the 2nd Legislative Yuan
Members of the 3rd Legislative Yuan
Keelung Members of the Legislative Yuan
Government ministers of Taiwan